The Indian Super League is the top football league in India. Founded in 2014, the 2015 season saw an average attendance of 27,111 between the eight teams, higher than the average from the league's inaugural season in 2014.

Highest Attended Matches

Season averages

ISL attendance compared to the other leagues

See also
 List of Indian Super League stadiums
 List of Indian Super League records and statistics 
 List of Indian Super League seasons 
 List of Indian Super League owners 
 List of Indian Super League head coaches 
 List of foreign Indian Super League players 
 List of Indian Super League hat-tricks

References

Attendance
Indian Super League
Super League